María Fernanda Mackenna Cooper (born 2 December 1986, in Santiago) is a Chilean sprinter who competes in the 200 and 400 metres. She has won multiple medals at regional revel.

International competitions

Personal bests
Outdoor
100 metres – 11.85 (+1.5 m/s, Santiago 2012)
200 metres – 23.67 (+0.9 m/s, Santiago 2012)
400 metres – 53.13 (Santiago 2018)
Indoor
200 metres – 24.53 (Albuquerque 2016)
400 metres – 54.45 (Cochabamba, 2020)

References

1986 births
Living people
Chilean female sprinters
Athletes (track and field) at the 2007 Pan American Games
Athletes (track and field) at the 2015 Pan American Games
Athletes (track and field) at the 2019 Pan American Games
Pan American Games competitors for Chile
Athletes (track and field) at the 2018 South American Games
Sportspeople from Santiago
South American Games silver medalists for Chile
South American Games bronze medalists for Chile
South American Games medalists in athletics
20th-century Chilean women
21st-century Chilean women